Gaurotes pictiventris is a species of beetle in the family Cerambycidae. It was described by Pesarini and Sabbadini in 1997.

References

Lepturinae
Beetles described in 1997